Alex Reinaldo da Silva Viera (born 8 March 1991), known as Alex Reinaldo, is a Brazilian professional footballer who plays as a right-back for São Bernardo.

Career statistics

References

External links

1991 births
Living people
Brazilian footballers
Association football defenders
Campeonato Brasileiro Série B players
Campeonato Brasileiro Série D players
União Agrícola Barbarense Futebol Clube players
Clube Atlético Bragantino players
Avaí FC players
Clube Atlético Sorocaba players
Esporte Clube São Bento players
Red Bull Brasil players
Mogi Mirim Esporte Clube players
Mirassol Futebol Clube players
Associação Desportiva São Caetano players